Saint-Sauveur is a commune in the Finistère department of Brittany in north-western France.

Population
Inhabitants of Saint-Sauveur are called in French Salvatoriens.

See also
Communes of the Finistère department
Roland Doré sculptor Sculptor local cross

References

External links

Mayors of Finistère Association 

Communes of Finistère